Gordon Cochrane may refer to:

 Mickey Cochrane (Gordon Stanley Cochrane, 1903–1962), baseball player and manager
 Gordon Cochrane (pilot) (1916–1994), officer of the Royal New Zealand Air Force during the World War II